Kuropatkino or Kakavadzor is a village de facto in the Martuni Province of the breakaway Republic of Artsakh, de jure in the Khojavend District of Azerbaijan, in the disputed region of Nagorno-Karabakh. The village had an Azerbaijani majority prior to their exodus during the First Nagorno-Karabakh War.

History 
During the Soviet period, the village was a part of the Martuni District of the Nagorno-Karabakh Autonomous Oblast.

Economy and culture 
The village is part of the community of Martuni.

Demographics 
The village had an ethnic Armenian population of 30 inhabitants in 2005.

References

External links 
 

Populated places in Martuni Province
Populated places in Khojavend District